Avishai Henik is an Israeli neurocognitive psychologist who works at Ben-Gurion University of the Negev (BGU). Henik studies voluntary and automatic (non-voluntary/reflexive) processes involved in cognitive operations. He characterizes automatic processes (in various areas of research), and clarifies their importance, the relationship between automatic and voluntary processes, and their neural underpinnings. Most of his work involves research with human participants and in recent years, he has been working with Archer fish in order to examine evolutionary aspects of various cognitive functions.

Biography 
Avishai Henik was born in Tel Aviv in 1945. He received his undergraduate degree in psychology and education from Ben-Gurion University of the Negev in 1971. He then moved to the Hebrew University of Jerusalem to study for his MA and PhD degrees under the supervision of Nobel Laureate Daniel Kahneman. He received his PhD in 1979. In 1980, Henik received a Rothschild post-doctoral fellowship and spent two years in Eugene, Oregon, in the laboratory of Michael I. Posner, considered a leading pioneer in building the field of cognitive neuroscience, and the neuropsychology laboratory led by Michael I. Posner and Oscar S.M. Marin in Portland, Oregon, U.S.A.

Academic career 
Henik began as a lecturer at Ben-Gurion University of the Negev in 1979 and was promoted to Senior Lecturer in 1984, then to associate professor in 1992 and to a full professor in 1996. Ben-Gurion University of the Negev endowed him with the Zlotowski Chair in Cognitive Neuropsychology in 1999 and a Distinguished Professor degree in 2014. He is currently continuing his research as an emeritus distinguished professor.

Academic work 
Avishai Henik heads the Cognitive Neuropsychology Laboratory. His work is multidisciplinary—he studies mental operations, which serve as building blocks for a given cognitive function, as well as the brain tissues involved in these operations. His early works focused on single word processing and the Stroop effect and later on visual spatial attention, numerical cognition, dyscalculia, emotions, and synesthesia. He has written over 200 articles, in addition to an edited book entitled, Continuous Issues in Numerical Cognition: How Many or How Much.

Attention
Henik started his work on attention under the supervision of Daniel Kahneman in the middle of the 1970s. Kahneman and Henik published two papers on selective attention, one of which has been heavily cited throughout the years. Since then, Henik studied the neurocognitive mechanisms that underlie orienting of visual-spatial attention and selective attention. Studies conducted in his laboratory and in collaboration with other researchers (e.g., Robert Rafal) documented the distinction between the involuntary-exogenous and the voluntary-endogenous attentional systems, the cortical and subcortical neural structures that subserve these systems, and developmental trajectories in attention. His studies, on patients as well as the Archer fish, documented the role of subcortical structures (e.g., superior colliculus) in inhibition of return (IOR). His research on selective attention uses a range of tasks like the Stroop, flanker, and the stop-signal task, which require selection and control over habitual responding. This research led Henik to study cognitive control and executive functions.

Cognitive control and emotional self-regulation 
Henik's research in this area aims at understanding the development of goal-directed behavior and self-regulation. Research in his laboratory has shown that cognitive control and emotional regulation could work in top-down or bottom-up pathways. Emotions, commonly thought to involve subcortical structures (e.g., amygdala), can be regulated by cognitive control (that involves higher brain structures in the cerebral cortex) and are affected by training. Moreover, attentional alerting (thought to involve subcortical brain structures) was found to modulate cognitive control / executive functions.

Numerical cognition 
Henik studies the building blocks of numerical cognition and developmental dyscalculia—a specific deficiency in arithmetic that is similar in nature and prevalence to dyslexia. Together with Joseph Tzelgov, Henik designed the numerical Stroop task and showed (a) the intimate relationship between sizes and numbers, and (b) the fact that numerical values are processed automatically even when completely irrelevant to the task. In subsequent years, it was found that performance in the numerical Stroop task depends on knowledge of the numerical system, involves specific brain areas (i.e., the cortical intraparietal sulcus), and is compromised in developmental dyscalculia and acalculia. In recent years Henik pointed out the importance of non-countable dimensions (e.g., which object is larger in size, how much water is in the glass) to numerical cognition. In recent publications, Henik and colleagues suggested the existence of a magnitude sense rather than a number sense, with the former based on the ability to perceive and evaluate non-countable dimensions (e.g., size). Henik and colleagues edited three books in numerical cognition. One dealt with the role of continuous dimensions, one with heterogeneity of functions involved in numerical cognition, and one with learning and education in mathematical cognition.

Synesthesia 
It has been suggested that synesthesia can serve as a window to understanding crucial issues in object perception such as feature binding, and that it documents cross-talk between supposedly separate systems (e.g., vision and audition). In studies of synesthesia, Henik and his colleagues combined behavioral and brain imaging techniques as well as harnessed other techniques (e.g., hypnosis) in order to examine fundamental issues in the field.

Academic administration
Henik assumed various roles in academic administration. At BGU, he was Dean of the Faculty of Humanities and Social Sciences, chairperson for the Department of Behavioral Sciences, and for the Zlotowski Center for Neuroscience. On a national level (Israel), he was a member of the first board of directors of FIRST (Focal Initiative in Research in Science and Technology, Bikura), founded by the Israel Science Foundation (ISF). He was also a member of the CHE (Council of Higher Education) international committee for the evaluation of accredited Psychology and Behavioral Sciences studies in Israel. On an international level, he was a member of the executive committee of the European Society for Cognitive Psychology (ESCoP) and the chair of the governing board of the recently established Mathematical Cognition and Learning Society (MCLS).

Notable grant support
Henik was the instigator and chair of a multidisciplinary think-tank, sponsored by the Israeli Ministry of Education, whose function was to better understand the cross roads where neuroscience, cognitive science and education meet. The aim was to identify developments in the field and the ramifications for education. Henik was also supported by the ISF in the framework of a Center of Excellence for the study of numerical cognition. At the time, this center was the only one in Psychology that was awarded funding since Humanities and Social Sciences were added to the Centers of Excellence program in 2000. In 2012, Henik won a prestigious European Research Council (ERC) Advanced Researcher Grant, which is awarded to allow exceptional, established research leaders to pursue ground-breaking, high-risk projects that open new directions in their research field. Henik's ERC grant was awarded to study the role of size perception and evaluation in numerical cognition. The main methods involved in this research include behavioral studies dealing with typical and atypical development of numerical concepts, imaging studies, work on lower animals (i.e., Archer fish, who are able to evaluate sizes but who do not have a cerebral cortex, which is thought to be central in arithmetic) and examination of computational aspects of development through evolutionary algorithms.

Notable awards 

 2017 - Excellent Mentor Prize, awarded by the Israel Society for Neuroscience (ISFN) for exceptional mentoring in neuroscience.
 2018 - Humboldt Research Award, awarded by the Alexander von Humboldt Foundation, in recognition of accomplishments in research and teaching.
 2020 - FENS-Kavli Network of Excellence Mentoring Prize 2020, awarded by the Federation of European Neuroscience Societies and the Kavli Foundation scholars network for demonstrated leadership in fostering the careers of neuroscientists.

References

External links 
 CV 

Hebrew University of Jerusalem alumni
Israeli people of Lithuanian-Jewish descent
1945 births
Living people
Israeli cognitive scientists
Israeli Jews
Scientists  from Tel Aviv
European Research Council grantees